Sandra Castillo, known as Sindri is a Miami-based music performer and DJ.

Discography 
Product Details
Bumpin Grind (Sindri & Jnasty, 2010)
Bout To Hit The Bloc (Estimé Records, 2007)
Raw Sugar (Angstprod, 2006)
Under An Attack, Waiting To Happen (Imputor?, 2005)
Split 7" with Plastiq Phantom / Otto Von Schirach (Imputor?, 2002)

External links 
Official Sindri Website
Sindri @ Imputor? Records
Sindri @ Last.fm

American electronic musicians
Living people
Year of birth missing (living people)